"Revival" is the third studio album from the Northern Ireland-based hard rock band The Answer and was released on October 3, 2011 via Spinefarm Records. The initial run of the album is a limited-edition deluxe format with 24-page booklet and band sleeve notes, including an 11-track second disc containing previously unreleased studio, acoustic, demo and cover material.

"Revival" was produced by Chris "Frenchie" Smith and mixed by Chris Sheldon.

Track listing

Personnel
Cormac Neeson - vocals, harmonica, piano, mellotron
Paul Mahon - guitar, backing vocals
Micky Waters - bass, backing vocals
James Heatley - drums, percussion, backing vocals

Additional personnel
Paully "Deathwish" Etheredge - Hammond M1 on "Waste Your Tears" and "Vida (I Want You)", keyboards on "Tornado", "Caught on the Riverbed" and "One More Revival", piano on "Lights Are Down" and "Lights Are Down" (vocals & piano version)
Chris "Frenchie" Smith - additional percussion on "Trouble", "Vida (I Want You)" and "One More Revival", backing vocals on "Trouble" and "Tailspin", mellotron effects on "Destroy Me"
Lynne Jackaman (from Saint Jude) - vocals on "Nowhere Freeway"
Zee Asha & Maria Q - additional vocals on "One More Revival"
Julia Magness & Tracy Todd - backing vocals on "One More Revival"
Jamie Muhoberac - keyboards on "Faith Gone Down"
Alex Brown - backing vocals on "Faith Gone Down"

Production
Chris "Frenchie" Smith - production on all tracks from disc 1, and "Piece by Piece", "Faith Gone Down", "Tailspin", "Fire and Water" and "Lights Are Down" (vocals & piano version), mixing on "Tailspin"
The Answer - production on "Nowhere Freeway" (live acoustic), "Tailspin", "Caught on the Riverbed" (alt. steel version), "The Enemy", "Show Me the World" and "One More Revival" (live acoustic)
Jason Buntz - engineering on all tracks from disc 1, and "Piece by Piece", "Faith Gone Down", "Fire and Water"
Chris Sheldon - mixing on all tracks from disc 1, and "Piece by Piece", "Faith Gone Down", "Fire and Water" and "Lights Are Down" (vocals & piano version)
Paul Mahon - mixing on "Nowhere Freeway" (live acoustic), "Caught on the Riverbed" (alt. steel version), "The Enemy", "Show Me the World" and "One More Revival" (live acoustic)
All tracks mastered by Shawn Joseph at Optimum Mastering

References

2011 albums
The Answer (band) albums
Spinefarm Records albums
Albums produced by Chris "Frenchie" Smith